Pál Szende (born as Pál Schwarz, 7 February 1879 – 15 July 1934) was a Hungarian politician, who served as Minister of Finance between 1918 and 1919. From 1904 he worked as a lawyer. He participated in the radical political movement along with Oszkár Jászi. After the establishment of the Hungarian Soviet Republic he lived in Vienna. Szende took part in the Austrian Civil War after that he escaped to Czechoslovakia then Romania, where he died. Pál Szende is buried in the city of Seini, Romania.

Works
 Magyar háborus adópolitika [Hungarian war by tax policy], 1917
 Krise der mitteleuropaischen Revolution [The crisis of the Central European revolution], 1921
 'Soziologische Gedanken zur Relativitätstheorie' [Sociological thought to relativity theory], Die neue Rundschau, Vol. 32, Frankfurt a. Main 1921, p. 1086
 Verhüllung und Enthüllung: der Kampf der Ideologien in der Geschichte [Concealment and revelation: the struggle of ideologies in history], Leipzig, 1922. Partial French translation in Gabel et al., L'aliénation aujourd'hui, Paris, 1974, pp. 319–49.
 'Wissenschaft und Autorität', Der Kampf, Vol. 15, No. 9/10 (1922), p. 302
 'Das System der Wissenschaften und die Gesellschaftsordnung', Kölner Vierteljahreshefte für Sozialwissenschaften, Vol. 2, No. 4 (1922), p. 7
 'Eine soziologische Theorie der Abstraktion' [A sociological theory of abstraction], Archiv für Sozialwissenschaft und Sozialpolitik, April 1923
 Der Faschismus in Europa, Der Kampf, 22:4 (1929), p. 200
 'Bergson: der Metaphysiker der Gegenrevolution' [Bergson: the metaphysician of the counter- revolution], Die Gesellschaft, Vol. 2 (1930), pp. 552ff.
 'Nationales Recht und Klassenrecht. – Beiträge aus der ungarischen Rechts- und Wirtschaftsgeschichte', Festschrift für Carl Grünberg. Zum 70. Geburtstag, Leipzig, 1932, pp. 445–478
 'Das Zeitalter der Denkfaulheit' [The age of intellectual laziness], Der Kampf, Vol. 26, No. 11 (1933), pp. 453–55
 Demaskierung: Die Rolle der Ideologien in der Geschichte'' [Unmasking: the role of ideology in history], 1970.

References
 Magyar Életrajzi Lexikon

1879 births
1934 deaths
People from Nyírbátor
Finance ministers of Hungary
Hungarian communists
Hungarian philosophers
Jewish Hungarian politicians